Hypsotropa pusillella is a species of snout moth in the genus Hypsotropa. It was described by Ragonot in 1888, and is known from Zanzibar.

References

Moths described in 1888
Anerastiini